Cylichnella is a genus of sea snails or bubble snails, marine gastropod molluscs in the family Cylichnidae, the "chalice bubble snails".

Species
 Cylichnella agulhasensis (Thiele, 1925)
 Cylichnella bidentata (d'Orbigny, 1841)
 Cylichnella defuncta F. Baker & Hanna, 1927
 † Cylichnella duqmensis Harzhauser, 2007 
 Cylichnella gonzagensis (F. Baker & Hanna, 1927)
 Cylichnella goslineri Valdés & Camacho-Garcia, 2004
 Cylichnella oryza (Totten, 1835)
 Cylichnella takekosugei Thach, 2020
Taxa inquirenda
 Cylichnella meridionalis (E.A. Smith, 1902) 
 Cylichnella minuscula (W. H. Turton, 1932) 
Species brought into synonymy
 Subgenus Cylichnella (Bullinella) Newton, 1891: synonym of Cylichna Lovén, 1846
 Cylichnella (Bullinella) diegensis Dall, 1919: synonym of Cylichna diegensis (Dall, 1919) (basionym)
Subgenus Cylichnella (Cylichnium) Dall, 1908: synonym of Cylichnium Dall, 1908 (original rank)
 Cylichnella bistriata Tomlin, 1920: synonym of Cylichna bistriata (Tomlin, 1920) (original combination)
 Cylichnella diegensis Dall, 1919: synonym of Cylichna diegensis (Dall, 1919) (original combination)
 Cylichnella nitens (E. A. Smith, 1872): synonym of Cylichna nitens E. A. Smith, 1872
 Cylichnella rolleri (Ev. Marcus, 1977): synonym of Acteocina culcitella (Gould, 1853)
 † Cylichnella soror Suter, 1917: synonym of † Retusa soror (Suter, 1917) (original combination)

References

External links

 Neave, Sheffield Airey. (1939-1996). Nomenclator Zoologicus vol. 1-10 Online 

Cylichnidae